Fred Åkerström (27 January 1937 – 9 August 1985) was a Swedish folk guitarist and singer particularly noted for his interpretations of Carl Michael Bellman's music, and his own work of the typically Swedish song segment named visa. These songs, visor, are traditionally very narrative and the performance is "acted" to some degree. The singer is in context a vissångare, a troubadour character. Åkerström was also known for his actor's interpretations of Bellman's 18th century material, and his unusual ability to reach deep bass notes (especially on his interpretation of Bellman's song Glimmande nymf).

Life
Åkerström was born in Stockholm to a family of meager circumstances, which would later influence the social, economic, and political criticisms found in many of his works and public appearances. He may have aspired at an early age to become a vissångare, being a devoted listener to Ruben Nilson. After performances at the famous vispråmen "Storken," he released his first record in 1963, Fred Åkerström sjunger Ruben Nilson. He was a contemporary of Cornelis Vreeswijk, and the two were at times very close, touring together and releasing a joint record, early in their careers. He became an alcoholic in later life. His daughter CajsaStina Åkerström is also a singer.

Bellman interpreter

Åkerström believed that Bellman had been misinterpreted by an earlier generation of artists: far from being a jolly and romantic person, Bellman was, Åkerström thought, an accurate social reporter of poverty, sickness, death and suffering. Like Vreeswijk, Åkerström was a major interpreter of Carl Michael Bellman's songs, giving them "a new and more powerful expression" than they had had before, starting with his live performance of one of Fredman's Epistles, "Nå skruva fiolen" in 1964. He published ten albums containing Bellman songs, of which three were dedicated to that subject: Fred sjunger Bellman in 1969; Glimmande nymf in 1974; and Vila vid denna källa in 1977. His performances increased in intensity until it seemed to audience and critics that Åkerström was identifying himself with Bellman. In his book Ingenstans fri som en fågel, Peter Mosskin wrote of Åkerström that no-one in two hundred years had succeeded better at bringing Bellman to life, making the story of his music an important element in Swedish cultural history. His later Bellman recordings combined his guitar with cello and flute.

Political views

In the late 1960s, Åkerström was influenced by left wing politics and started recording more political songs such as Kapitalismen (Capitalism) which originally was a danish protest song written by Per Dich. He also joined the Communist Party (known then as KPML(r)) and published the songs under their record label Proletärkultur

Discography
Fred Åkerström sjunger Ruben Nilson (1963)
Fred besjunger Frida (1964), visor by Birger Sjöberg
Visor och oförskämdheter (1964), concert tour recordings with Cornelis Vreeswijk och Ann-Louise Hanson
Visor i närheten (1965) visor by Fritz Sjöström
Doktor Dolittle (1965)
Dagsedlar åt kapitalismen (1967)
Fred sjunger Bellman (1969) Bellman interpretations
Mera Ruben Nilson (1971)
Två tungor (1972), includes song "Jag ger dig min morgon"
Glimmande nymf (1974) with Trio CMB (guitar, flute, cello) Bellman interpretations
Bananskiva (1976)
Vila vid denna källa (1977) with Trio CMB (guitar, flute, cello) Bellman interpretations
Sjöfolk och landkrabbor (1978)
Åkerströms blandning (1982)

References

1937 births
1985 deaths
Singers from Stockholm
Swedish songwriters
Swedish guitarists
Male guitarists
20th-century Swedish male singers
20th-century guitarists
Interpreters of Carl Michael Bellman's works